The Golf Course is a metro station on the Blue Line of the Delhi Metro.

Station layout

Facilities
List of available ATM at Golf Course metro station are Punjab National Bank.

See also
List of Delhi Metro stations
Transport in Delhi
Delhi Metro Rail Corporation
Delhi Suburban Railway
List of rapid transit systems in India

References

External links
 Delhi Metro Rail Corporation Ltd. (Official site) 
 Delhi Metro Annual Reports
 
 UrbanRail.Net – descriptions of all metro systems in the world, each with a schematic map showing all stations.

Delhi Metro stations
Railway stations opened in 2009
Railway stations in Gautam Buddh Nagar district
Transport in Noida
2009 establishments in Uttar Pradesh